Zeki Yavru (born 5 September 1991) is a Turkish footballer who plays as a right back for TFF First League club Samsunspor.

External links
Profile at TFF.org
 
 

1991 births
Sportspeople from Trabzon
Living people
Turkish footballers
Turkey B international footballers
Association football fullbacks
Association football defenders
1461 Trabzon footballers
Trabzonspor footballers
Kayserispor footballers
Gençlerbirliği S.K. footballers
Akhisarspor footballers
Denizlispor footballers
Yeni Malatyaspor footballers
Giresunspor footballers
Samsunspor footballers
Süper Lig players
TFF First League players
TFF Second League players